Estadio Jorge Andrade is a multi-use stadium in Azogues, Ecuador.  It is currently used mostly for football matches and is the home stadium of Deportivo Azogues and Gualaceo. The stadium holds 14,000 people and opened in 1984.  Because of the capacity requirements of the Serie B and Segunda División, the stadium is being used in place of the regular stadium, Estadio Federativo.

External links
Stadium information

Jorge Andrade
Buildings and structures in Cañar Province